Naomi O. Seligman is a member of the board of directors of Oracle Corporation since November 2005. She previously served as a director of Akamai Technologies from November 2001 to May 2019.
She was also a member of the board of directors of Sun Microsystems from June 1999 until her resignation in August 2007. 

Seligman and her husband Ernest von Simson founded The Research Board in 1973 and then, in 1998, sold it to Gartner.

References

External links
Oracle: Official biography

Oracle employees
Living people
Vassar College alumni
Year of birth missing (living people)